Tournefortia stenosepala is a species of plant in the family Boraginaceae. It is endemic to Ecuador.  Its natural habitat is subtropical or tropical dry shrubland. It is threatened by habitat loss.

References

stenosepala
Endemic flora of Ecuador
Data deficient plants
Taxonomy articles created by Polbot